Strahm may refer to:
 Dale Strahm (born c. 1943), American football coach
 Dick Strahm (born 1934), American football coach
 Matt Strahm (born 1991), American baseball player
 Peter Strahm, a character in Saw
 Victor Herbert Strahm (1895–1957), World War I flying ace